"Déjame Ir" (English: "Let Me Go") is the  first single by Mexican singer Paty Cantú from her debut studio album, Me Quedo Sola, released in 2008.

Commercial Performance
The song topped the airplay chart in Mexico, becoming Cantu's first number one hit and establishing her career as a pop star.

Charts

References

External links
"Déjame Ir" music video at YouTube.com

Paty Cantú songs
Spanish-language songs
2008 songs
EMI Records singles
Songs written by Paty Cantú
2008 debut singles